Milan Nikolić (Serbian Cyrillic: Милан Николић; born 2 July 1979 in Jagodina), also known professionally as Milaan, is a Serbian accordionist who was the Serbian entry for the Eurovision Song Contest 2009 with Marko Kon. The song "Cipela" was chosen to represent Serbia in the 2009 national final of the Eurovision Song Contest.  It competed in the second semi final but failed to reach the final.

References

External links 

1979 births
Living people
People from Jagodina
Serbian accordionists
Eurovision Song Contest entrants of 2009
Eurovision Song Contest entrants for Serbia
21st-century accordionists
Beovizija contestants
Beovizija winners